Vera Kamtukule is a Malawian author, writer, publisher, activist and politician, who holds a ministerial position in the Cabinet of Malawi. Vera Kamtukule was appointed minister of Tourism on 31 January 2023. Until her appointment Vera served as the Minister Labour  since 26 January 2022 and as deputy Minister of Labour following the 2020 Malawian presidential election. In 2021 Vera Kamtukule assumed her role as Chair of the SADC Employment and Labour Sector.

Early life and education 
Vera Kamtukule was born on 31 December 1981 in the township of Zingwangwa, Blantyre,  Southern Region, Malawi. She went to school in Zingwangwa Secondary School, where she was selected to go and study for her college degree at the University of Malawi, Chancellor College. She later on went to study for her Master of Science Degree in Strategic Management obtained from the University of Derby, UK.  Vera holds a professional diploma in marketing and a post graduate diploma in land management.   Currently she  is studying for her PhD in Transformative Community Development at the Mzuzu University. She was the chief executive officer for Malawi Scotland Partnership until her ministerial appointment.

Publications 
In 2013 Vera Kamtukule wrote a book titled "The Supply and Demand of Housing in Malawi" which was published by Lambert Academic Publishing. In 2020 one of her books Made to Bloom won the African Authors Award. Kamtukule has since published other five books,  More Than A Pastor's Wife, The Professional Woman, The Absalomic Loss, 41 Things That Destroy Good Women and 29 Things that Destroy Good Men.

Personal life 
Vera Kamtukule is married to Edson Kamtukule, together they have two daughters.

References

External links
 

Living people
University of Malawi alumni
Alumni of the University of Derby
Women government ministers of Malawi
21st-century women politicians
21st-century Malawian writers
Malawian expatriates in the United Kingdom
21st-century Malawian politicians
Malawian women writers
People from Blantyre
1981 births